David Summers is the first solo album released by Spanish musician David Summers in 1994.

The album includes collaborations with Alejandro Sanz and Dani Mezquita, and was dedicated to David's father, Manuel Summers, in light of his death.

Track listing

References

External links
 David Summers Biography - Yahoo!
 hombresg.8k.com - David Summers - Discography

1994 albums